Capria is an Italian surname. Notable people with this surname include:

 Alana I. Capria, an American writer
 Carl Capria, a former American football defensive back
 Don Capria, an American writer
 Nicola Capria, an Italian politician
 Raffaele La Capria, an Italian novelist and screenwriter
 Rubén Capria, an Argentine former professional footballer

Italian-language surnames